Archontophoenicinae is a botanical subtribe consisting of four genera of palms, namely Archontophoenix from Queensland and New South Wales and Actinokentia, Chambeyronia and Kentiopsis from New Caledonia. Phylogenetic relationships between the four genera are unresolved.

Description
The palms in this subtribe are medium-sized palms, with well-developed, distinct crownshafts and strictly pinnate leaves with generally short and massive petioles. The inflorescences are branched to two or three orders, with the prophyll and penduncular bracts similar.  The subtribe is homogenous compared to other subtribes of the Areceae. All the genera have more than six stamens. The New Caledonian genera have distinctive leaf anatomy and may share a common ancestor (Uhl and Dransfield 1987:367).

References
Dransfield, John, Natalie W Uhl, Conny B Asmussen, William J Baker, Madeline M Harley, and Carl E Lewis (2005) A new phylogenetic classification of the palm family, Arecaceae. Kew Bulletin, Vol. 60 (2005).
Uhl, Natalie W. and Dransfield, John (1987) Genera Palmarum - A classification of palms based on the work of Harold E. Moore. Lawrence, Kansas: Allen Press.  / .

References

 
Plant subtribes
Australasian realm flora